Fleurimont is an arrondissement, or borough, of the city of Sherbrooke, Quebec, Canada on the Saint-François River. The borough comprises the former city of Fleurimont and the eastern portion of pre-amalgamation Sherbrooke.

As a separate city, Fleurimont had a population of 16,521 in the Canada 2001 Census. As a borough of Sherbrooke, it has a population of 44,950, making it the third most populous borough in the city, behind Brompton–Rock Forest–Saint-Élie–Deauville and Des Nations

Government

The borough is represented by five councillors on the Sherbrooke City Council.

References

External links
Borough of Fleurimont

Boroughs of Sherbrooke
Former cities in Quebec
Former municipalities in Quebec
Populated places disestablished in 2002